The Johns House is a historic house in White Springs, Florida. It is located at the junction of CR 135 and Adams Memorial Drive. On July 10, 1998, it was added to the U.S. National Register of Historic Places.

References

Houses completed in 1928
Houses in Hamilton County, Florida
Houses on the National Register of Historic Places in Florida
Vernacular architecture in Florida
National Register of Historic Places in Hamilton County, Florida